Joseph Henri Marceau (October 29, 1879 – April 9, 1955) was an Ontario contractor and political figure. He represented Nipissing in the Legislative Assembly of Ontario from 1919 to 1923 and from 1935 to 1937 as a Liberal member.

He was born in Pont-Rouge, Quebec, the son of Hypolite Marceau, and was educated in North Bay, Ontario. In 1900, he married Elida Seguin. Marceau was a general contractor and was also involved in the timber trade. He also served as a member of the town council for North Bay from 1909 to 1912. Marceau was an unsuccessful candidate for a seat in the provincial assembly in 1914. He was elected for a second time in a 1935 by-election held after the death of Théodore Legault. He died in 1955 and was buried at St. Marys Roman Catholic Cemetery in Nipissing.

References

Sources
 Canadian Parliamentary Guide, 1922, EJ Chambers

External links 

North Bay, Past, Present, Prospective, WKP Kennedy (1961)

1879 births
1955 deaths
Ontario Liberal Party MPPs
Franco-Ontarian people
People from Capitale-Nationale
People from North Bay, Ontario